Den Dekker is a Dutch occupational surname meaning "the thatcher". Other, more common forms of the surname are De Decker, De Dekker, and Dekker. Notable people named Den Dekker include:

Matt den Dekker (born 1987), American baseball outfielder
Michelle den Dekker (born 1966), Australian netball player
Nathalie den Dekker (born 1989), Dutch lawyer and beauty queen
Michael DenDekker (born 1961), American (New York) politician

References

Dutch-language surnames
Occupational surnames